Snake Eater may refer to:
A member or former member of the United States Army Special Forces (i.e. Green Berets). This nickname was acquired due to the Special Forces serving snake meat at the Gabriel Demonstration Area on Fort Bragg, for visiting VIPs, the press, etc.
Snake Eater (identification system), the military insurgent database developed for Iraqi soldiers by U.S. military personnel and companies.
 Ophiophagy, a specialized form of feeding or alimentary behavior of animals which hunt and eat snakes
Snake Eater (film), a 1989 action film starring Lorenzo Lamas
 Snake-Eater, a fictional member of the Phoenix Guard in G.I. Joe: America's Elite
Metal Gear Solid 3: Snake Eater, a 2004 video game by Hideo Kojima (Konami)
 Snake Eater (lacrosse), Native American lacrosse player